Merry-Go-Round was an Australian television series which aired on Melbourne station HSV-7 during 1961. A variety series, it also featured a "barrel quiz" and an amateur talent segment.

Hosted by Panda Lisner and Michael Williamson, it was produced at the newly-opened Channel 7 Teletheatre in Fitzroy, Victoria, probably before a live audience. The series aired in a 60-minute time-slot at 9:30PM on Mondays, and faced tough competition from the popular In Melbourne Tonight on GTV-9.

References

External links
Merry-Go-Round on IMDb

1961 Australian television series debuts
1961 Australian television series endings
Black-and-white Australian television shows
English-language television shows
Australian variety television shows